Kisangani Simisini Air Base  is a military airport in the city of Kisangani, capital of the Tshopo Province of the Democratic Republic of the Congo.

The airport is now a military airfield, though it also serves humanitarian flights and some private operations.

The Bangoka VOR-DME (Ident: KGI) and non-directional beacon (Ident: KIS) are located  respectively east of the airport, at the Bangoka International Airport.

History
As Kisangani Ville Airport, it was the original airport of the city, then named Stanleyville. In the turbulent times of Congo's independence and the subsequent struggles, it was the city's only airport, and was the scene of severe fighting during the Simba Rebellion and the associated Operation Dragon Rouge in 1964.

See also

Transport in the Democratic Republic of the Congo
List of airports in the Democratic Republic of the Congo

References

External links
OpenStreetMap - Kisangani Simisini Airport
 OurAirports - Kisangani Simisini Airport
 FallingRain - Kisangani Simisini Airport

Airports in Tshopo
Buildings and structures in Kisangani